The 2S4 Tyulpan (often spelled Tulpan) is a Soviet 240 mm self-propelled heavy mortar. "2S4" is its GRAU designation. The Tyulpan is the largest mortar system in use today.

History 

Following World War II, the Soviet Union developed two types of heavy infantry mortar in 160 and 240 mm calibres, both conventional albeit breech-loaded designs. Due to their relatively large dimensions, total mass and the heavy weight of their projectiles (and the M-240 in particular), these mortars could hardly hope to function in the field as infantry weapons, losing the features making such weapons desirable, that is their relatively simple operation, speed of deployment and mobility.

To alleviate the obvious mobility concerns, the military leadership proposed to mount the heavy mortar on a self-propelled, tracked chassis with the guns installed externally on the chassis, rather than in an enclosed superstructure or turret. For firing, the gun was to be pivoted at the vehicle's rear and anchored in the ground with the use of a massive recoil-absorbing base plate. Such a solution would help to simplify the overall design and construction of the vehicle and allow for a smaller, lighter prime mover. Initially, designers planned to utilize a common chassis used in the 2S1 Gvozdika self-propelled howitzer, but quickly found it was not robust enough to handle the significant recoil (approximately 400 tonne-force).

A formal agreement to initiate work on the new project was signed on July 4, 1967, but preliminary design had been ongoing at the OKB-3 experimental design bureau since 1966 under G. Yefremov. The new vehicle was developed by a team of engineers from the SKB (design bureau) of the Perm Machine Building Plant named after V. I. Lenin, using the M-240 towed mortar as the basis. This weapon has a long history, dating back to 1944 when it was first built, but formally adopted into service only in 1950 after addressing numerous deficiencies in the design. The M-240 was produced since 1958 and built in relatively minor numbers; only approximately three-hundred guns were built.

The mortar was operated by an 11-man crew and could be prepared to fire within 25 minutes, and continue to fire at a rate of approximately 1 round per minute. In the self-propelled variant, the weapon's tube and breechblock remained unchanged, but the base plate was substantially modified and the mortar used a different system of gun-laying gears and drives, which allowed the tube to traverse 41° in azimuth when elevated to the maximum extent, and only 10° traverse at the lower limit of elevation. The range of elevation achieved was 50° to 80°. During the design phase, the weapon system carried the designation LP-40.

An initial batch of three vehicles was completed in  mid-1969 and immediately directed into a factory trials program which concluded in October. The 'Tyulpan' was accepted into service with the USSR two years later, and serial production commenced in 1974. The 2S4 Tyulpan was seen by the west for the first time in 1975, and so received the NATO designation M-1975, whereas its official designation is 2S4.

The 2S4 saw action during the conflicts in Afghanistan and Chechnya. The extreme firepower per round compensates for the Tyulpan's slow rate of fire. There were also reports that the Tyulpan may have been used by the Syrian Army during the 2012 bombardment of Homs. Although, other reports suggest that the towed 240 mm mortar M240 were used instead. And OSCE observers, monitoring movements of equipment in the war in Donbas with an UAV, spotted a 2S4 on territory under control of the Donetsk People's Republic on 4 July 2015. In May 2022, 2S4 Tyulpan were reported being used in the Donbas campaign with one unit destroyed by Ukrainian counter-battery fire.

Description 

The 2S4 Tyulpan design shares the same chassis as the 2S3 Akatsiya, and carries an externally mounted 240 mm 2B8 mortar on the rear of the hull. The 2S4 has a capacity of 40 standard high-explosive rounds or 20 long-range rocket-assisted rounds. These are placed in two automated drum-type magazines. The rounds are fed to the top of the carrier, where they are placed on a track. The mortar then tilts to the horizontal position. The breech opens and a ramming device pushes the round into the breech. The breech closes and the mortar tilts into the firing position. In combat, the mortar is elevated between 50° and 80°, and it can fire one round per minute.

The primary ammunition for the weapon is the high-explosive 53-F-864 mortar projectile which has a total weight of 130 kg. The GMWZ-7 fuze could be set to have either a delayed action or detonate on contact. The weapon uses a five-part propelling charge system, which vary the muzzle velocity from 158 to 362 m/s and ensure a range of up to 9,650 m. 1970 saw the introduction of a new type of rocket-assisted family of munitions for the M-240, designated ARM-0-3WF2 (or simply 3WF2) which used a new 4BN56 propellant charge to carry a 228 kg high explosive projectile (designated 3F2 'Gagara') to a maximum range of 18 km. Also developed was the 3O8 'Nerpa' cargo mortar round which delivers 14 submunitions fitted with fragmentation warheads which are deployed over the target by miniature parachute, as well as the 'Sayda' incendiary round.

One of the more unique aspects of the 2S4 is their nuclear capability. Development of tactical nuclear munitions for the type  was initiated relatively late in the service cycle of the vehicle, in 1967, and resulted in the 3BW4 round using a 3B4 nuclear projectile with a yield of approx. 2 kt. This was improved on three years later with the development of a rocket-assisted 3WB11 nuclear round (using a 3B11 projectile with an RD-14 warhead and propelled by a 3M15 rocket motor). Development of a nuclear warhead for the M-240 was technologically limited for a period of time by the small bore of the weapon; miniaturization had only recently allowed for the reduction of the diameter of a nuclear device to a sufficiently small size so as to be used in a field artillery system. To date, the range of these nuclear projectiles has not been published, but the greater weight of such a warhead compared to the conventional mortar rounds compels experts to speculate on a lower range for such a projectile, and thus the questionable tactical utility of the system.

The carrier for the 2S4 was a dedicated tracked chassis also used with the 2K11 Krug TEL vehicle, and later used as the chassis for the 2S3 'Akatsiya' and 2S5 'Giatsint' self-propelled guns. Having carried out necessary modifications, this vehicle was designated Object 305. It's powered by 12-cylinder "V"-layout W-54 engine. The tracked suspensions consists of a pair of drive sprockets located at the front of the vehicle, idler wheels at the rear, six pairs of road wheels and four pairs of return rollers. The tracks are 482 mm wide each, with 115 links per tread. The vehicle is equipped with a lightweight bulldozer blade mounted to the underside of the front hull which is used for preparing dugouts for vehicle firing positions. The driver is seated on the left side of the hull, towards the front with the vehicle commander positioned directly behind him in a raised, fixed, armored cupola outfitted with vision blocks for situational awareness, and his hatch. The cupola is ringed by a skate mount that can be used to fix a PKT machine gun which can be configured to fired remotely with the crew buttoned down.

The 2S4 has a slow rate of fire, only one round per minute. This is due to the large size of the mortar and the weight of its ammunition  for a standard HE rounds and  rocket-assisted HE rounds. It can also be loaded one round at a time via a small crane, which is most often used to load the magazines or to place specialty rounds onto the loading track.

The 2S4 has a range of 9,650 meters using standard high-explosive rounds, but a range of 20,000 meters using extended range munition. In addition to the high explosive rounds, it can also fire armor-piercing, laser-guided and cluster munitions, as well as chemical, neutron and tactical nuclear rounds. The Russians have stated that the chemical and tactical nuclear munitions are no longer in service.

The 2S4s crew consist of a driver and the commander, plus an additional 3 support troops are needed to operate the mortar. The additional troops are usually carried by a separate armored personnel carrier.

Variants
 A modernized variant was introduced into service with Russian military in 2017. It has a new barrel, hydraulic recoil mechanism, communication systems, and positioning and fire-control system.

Operators

Current operators
  – 9 in active service/400 in storage. 5 destroyed by Armed Forces of Ukraine .
  – 24 vehicles in active service with the 3rd, 4th (passed on from the Defense Companies) and 10th Armoured Divisions, and the 14th Special Forces Airborne Division.

Former operators
  – only 4 vehicles used between 1985 and 1991.
  – unknown number used between 1984 and 1992, likely transferred to Syria.
  – Passed on to Russia.

See also
2B1 Oka
2S7 Pion
2A3 Kondensator 2P
180 mm gun S-23
240 mm mortar M240

References

External links

 Army Recognition Guide. The 2S4 TYULPAN M-1975 240mm self-propelled mortar on tracked armoured Russia
 Video of a Tyulpan mortar being fired
 A 2019 video of Tyulpan being fired
 2S4 240 mm Tulpan at armscontrol.ru
 www.globalsecurity.org
 The Russian Army's Super 'Gun' Is a City Destroyer - National Interest

 

Self-propelled artillery of the Soviet Union
Mortars of the Soviet Union
Tracked mortars
240 mm artillery
Nuclear artillery
Uraltransmash products
Military vehicles introduced in the 1970s